= Journal of Fish Diseases =

Journal

- Discipline: Fisheries, veterinary sciences
- Language: English
- Edited by: David J. Speare

Publication details
- History: 1978-present
- Publisher: John Wiley & Sons
- Frequency: Monthly
- Impact factor: 2.056 (2014)

Standard abbreviations
- ISO 4: J. Fish Dis.

Indexing
- ISSN: 1078-5884 (print); 1365-2761 (web)
- OCLC no.: 45254341

Links
- Journal homepage

The Journal of Fish Diseases is a peer-reviewed monthly journal publishing original research on disease in both wild and cultured fish and shellfish. According to the Journal Citation Reports, the journal has a 2014 impact factor of 2.056.
